The Weyburn Red Wings are a Canadian junior ice hockey team based in Weyburn, Saskatchewan playing in the Saskatchewan Junior Hockey League (SJHL). They play their home games at the Crescent Point Place, which has a seating capacity of 1,750.   The team colours are red and white. Radio station CHWY-FM K106 broadcasts all Red Wings road games, and select home games. All home games are webcast on HockeyTV.

History
The team began play in 1961, in the Saskatchewan Junior Hockey League, and was named after the NHL's Detroit Red Wings.  The team was one of the founding members of the Western Hockey League in 1966, but left in 1968 to return to the SJHL. Increasing travel costs of playing in the Western Hockey League was the main reason for moving back to the SJHL.  

The team is the most successful in the league in terms of league championships won.  They have won 8 SJHL championships in their history.  They won it in 1970, 1971, 1984, 1994, 1995, 1997, 1998, and 2001.

The Red Wings won the Abbott Cup in 1970, making them the Junior "A" Champion for Western Canada and earning a playoff against the George Richardson Memorial Trophy winning Eastern Champion for the Memorial Cup.  The Red Wings lost the Memorial Cup competition against the Montreal Junior Canadiens.

The team won the Royal Bank Cup, representative of national Canadian Junior A Hockey League supremacy, in 2005. They won the Cup on home ice, defeating the Camrose Kodiaks 3–2 in front of 2,152 fans in the championship game.  They also won the trophy in 1984, defeating the Orillia Travelways 3–0 in the seventh game in front of 2,375 fans at the Weyburn Colosseum.

Season-by-season standings

Playoffs
1969 Lost final
Weyburn Red Wings defeated Saskatoon Olympics 4-games-to-none
Regina Pats defeated Weyburn Red Wings 4-games-to-1
1970 Won league, won Abbott Cup, lost 1970 Memorial Cup final
Weyburn Red Wings defeated Moose Jaw Canucks 4-games-to-none
Weyburn Red Wings defeated Regina Pats 4-games-to-2 SAJHL champions
Weyburn Red Wings defeated Red Deer Rustlers (AJHL) 4-games-to-2
Weyburn Red Wings defeated Fort William Hurricanes (TBJHL) 4-games-to-2 Abbott Cup champions
Montreal Jr. Canadiens (OHA) defeated Weyburn Red Wings 4-games-to-none
1971 Won league, lost Man/Sask championship
Weyburn Red Wings defeated Melville Millionaires 4-games-to-2
Weyburn Red Wings defeated Humboldt Broncos 4-games-to-1 SAJHL champions
St. Boniface Saints (MJHL) defeated Weyburn Red Wings 4-games-to-2
1972 Lost quarter-final
Prince Albert Raiders defeated Weyburn Red Wings 4-games-to-2
1973 Lost semi-final
Weyburn Red Wings defeated Moose Jaw Canucks 4-games-to-1
Estevan Bruins defeated Weyburn Red Wings 4-games-to-1
1974 Lost semi-final
Weyburn Red Wings defeated Regina Blues 4-games-to-1
Estevan Bruins defeated Weyburn Red Wings 4-games-to-1
1975 Lost semi-final
Weyburn Red Wings defeated Estevan Bruins 4-games-to-3
Swift Current Broncos defeated Weyburn Red Wings 4-games-to-1
1976 Lost final
Weyburn Red Wings defeated Regina Blues 4-games-to-1
Weyburn Red Wings defeated Melville Millionaires 4-games-to-2
Prince Albert Raiders defeated Weyburn Red Wings 4-games-to-none
1977 Lost semi-final
Weyburn Red Wings defeated Regina Blues 4-games-to-2
Melville Millionaires defeated Weyburn Red Wings 4-games-to-1
1978 Lost quarter-final
Moose Jaw Canucks defeated Weyburn Red Wings 4-games-to-1
1979 Lost quarter-final
Melville Millionaires defeated Weyburn Red Wings 4-games-to-3
1980 Lost quarter-final
Prince Albert Raiders defeated Weyburn Red Wings 4-games-to-1
1981 Lost quarter-final
Moose Jaw Canucks defeated Weyburn Red Wings 4-games-to-1
1982 Lost semi-final
Weyburn Red Wings defeated Moose Jaw Canucks 4-games-to-2
Yorkton Terriers defeated Weyburn Red Wings 4-games-to-3
1983 Lost final
Weyburn Red Wings defeated Lloydminster Lancers 4-games-to-none
Weyburn Red Wings defeated Moose Jaw Canucks 4-games-to-3
Yorkton Terriers defeated Weyburn Red Wings 4-games-to-3
1984 Won league, won Anavet Cup, won Abbott Cup, won 1984 Centennial Cup
Weyburn Red Wings defeated Battlefords North Stars 4-games-to-none
Weyburn Red Wings defeated Melville Millionaires 4-games-to-3
Weyburn Red Wings defeated Yorkton Terriers 4-games-to-1 SAJHL champions
Weyburn Red Wings defeated Selkirk Steelers (MJHL) 4-games-to-2 Anavet Cup champions
Weyburn Red Wings defeated Langley Eagles (BCJHL) 4-games-to-none Abbott Cup champions
Weyburn Red Wings defeated Orillia Travelways (OJHL) 4-games-to-3 Centennial Cup champions
1985 Lost final
Weyburn Red Wings defeated Creighton Bombers 4-games-to-none
Weyburn Red Wings defeated Humboldt Broncos 4-games-to-none
Estevan Bruins defeated Weyburn Red Wings 4-games-to-3
1986 Lost semi-final
Weyburn Red Wings defeated Lloydminster Lancers 4-games-to-3
Estevan Bruins defeated Weyburn Red Wings 4-games-to-none
1987 Lost quarter-final
Battlefords North Stars defeated Weyburn Red Wings 4-games-to-2
1988 Lost quarter-final
Notre Dame Hounds defeated Weyburn Red Wings 4-games-to-none
1989 DNQ
1990 Lost semi-final
Weyburn Red Wings defeated Estevan Bruins 4-games-to-2
Nipawin Hawks defeated Weyburn Red Wings 4-games-to-3
1991 Lost semi-final
Weyburn Red Wings defeated Melville Millionaires 4-games-to-3Yorkton Terriers defeated Weyburn Red Wings 4-games-to-11992 Lost quarter-finalMelville Millionaires defeated Weyburn Red Wings 4-games-to-21993 Lost quarter-finalMelville Millionaires defeated Weyburn Red Wings 4-games-to-none1994 Won league, won Anavet Cup, lost 1994 Centennial Cup semi-finalWeyburn Red Wings defeated Notre Dame Hounds 4-games-to-1Weyburn Red Wings defeated Melville Millionaires 4-games-to-2Weyburn Red Wings defeated Melfort Mustangs 4-games-to-2 SJHL champions
Weyburn Red Wings defeated St. Boniface Saints (MJHL) 4-games-to-3 Anavet Cup champions
Fourth in 1994 Centennial Cup round robin (1-3)
Olds Grizzlys (AJHL) defeated Weyburn Red Wings 4-3 in semi-final
1995 Won league, lost Anavet CupWeyburn Red Wings defeated Yorkton Terriers 4-games-to-3Weyburn Red Wings defeated Lebret Eagles 4-games-to-noneWeyburn Red Wings defeated Battlefords North Stars 4-games-to-1 SJHL champions
Winnipeg South Blues (MJHL) defeated Weyburn Red Wings 4-games-to-21996 Lost preliminaryNotre Dame Hounds defeated Weyburn Red Wings 2-games-to-11997 Won league, won Anavet Cup, lost 1997 Royal Bank Cup semi-finalWeyburn Red Wings defeated Estevan Bruins 4-games-to-noneWeyburn Red Wings defeated Lebret Eagles 4-games-to-1Weyburn Red Wings defeated Battlefords North Stars 4-games-to-none SJHL champions
Weyburn Red Wings defeated St. James Canadians (MJHL) 4-games-to-1 Anavet Cup champions
First in 1997 Royal Bank Cup round robin (3-1)
Summerside Western Capitals (MJAHL) defeated Weyburn Red Wings 4-3 OT in semi-final
1998 Won league, won Anavet Cup, lost 1998 Royal Bank Cup finalWeyburn Red Wings defeated Estevan Bruins 4-games-to-1Weyburn Red Wings defeated Lebret Eagles 4-games-to-3Weyburn Red Wings defeated Nipawin Hawks 4-games-to-1 SJHL champions
Weyburn Red Wings defeated Winkler Flyers (MJHL) 4-games-to-3 Anavet Cup champions
Third in 1998 Royal Bank Cup round robin (2-2)
Weyburn Red Wings defeated Nanaimo Clippers (BCHL) 4-1 in semi-final
South Surrey Eagles (BCHL) defeated Weyburn Red Wings 4-1 in final
1999 DNQ2000 Lost finalSecond in round robin (2-2) vs. Estevan Bruins and Yorkton Terriers
Weyburn Red Wings defeated Notre Dame Hounds 4-games-to-2Weyburn Red Wings defeated Melville Millionaires 4-games-to-2Battlefords North Stars defeated Weyburn Red Wings 4-games-to-32001 Won league, won Anavet Cup, lost 2001 Royal Bank Cup semi-finalWeyburn Red Wings defeated Notre Dame Hounds 4-games-to-noneWeyburn Red Wings defeated Lebret Eagles 4-games-to-1Weyburn Red Wings defeated Nipawin Hawks 4-games-to-2 SJHL champions
Weyburn Red Wings defeated OCN Blizzard (MJHL) 4-games-to-2 Anavet Cup champions
Second in 2007 Royal Bank Cup round robin
Flin Flon Bombers defeated Weyburn Red Wings 4-0 in semi-final
2002 Lost quarter-finalNotre Dame Hounds defeated Weyburn Red Wings 4-games-to-22003 Lost quarter-finalYorkton Terriers defeated Weyburn Red Wings 4-games-to-22004 Lost finalWeyburn Red Wings defeated Notre Dame Hounds 4-games-to-1Weyburn Red Wings defeated Yorkton Terriers 4-games-to-2Kindersley Klippers defeated Weyburn Red Wings 4-games-to-22005 Lost preliminary, hosted and won 2005 Royal Bank CupHumboldt Broncos defeated Weyburn Red Wings 4-games-to-3First in 2005 Royal Bank Cup round robin (3-1)
Weyburn Red Wings defeated Hawkesbury Hawks (CJHL) 4-3 3OT  in semi-final
Weyburn Red Wings defeated Camrose Kodiaks (AJHL) 3-2 in final Royal Bank Cup champions
2006 Lost quarter-finalWeyburn Red Wings defeated Humboldt Broncos 4-games-to-2Yorkton Terriers defeated Weyburn Red Wings 4-games-to-22007 Lost quarter-finalWeyburn Red Wings defeated Notre Dame Hounds 4-games-to-1Melville Millionaires defeated Weyburn Red Wings 4-games-to-22008 Lost quarter-finalThird in round robin (0-2) vs. Melville Millionaires and Kindersley Klippers
Kindersley Klippers defeated Weyburn Red Wings 4-games-to-12009 Lost semi-finalWeyburn Red Wings defeated Kindersley Klippers 4-games-to-noneMelville Millionaires defeated Weyburn Red Wings 4-games-to-22010 Lost quarter-finalYorkton Terriers defeated Weyburn Red Wings 4-games-to-12011 Lost quarter-finalKindersley Klippers defeated Weyburn Red Wings 4-games-to-12012 Lost league finalWeyburn Red Wings defeated Estevan Bruins 4-games-to-noneWeyburn Red Wings defeated Melville Millionaires 4-games-to-3Humboldt Broncos defeated Weyburn Red Wings 4-games-to-2
2013 DNQ2014 DNQNHL alumniTotals include all incarnations of the Red Wings in the WHL and SJHL.''

Clayton Beddoes
Patrick Bordeleau
Gary Bromley
Cam Brown
Don Caley
Dwight Carruthers
Joe Daley
Don Gillen
Larry Giroux
Mark Hartigan
Larry Hornung
Greg Hubick
Dean Kennedy
Walt Ledingham
Bill Lesuk
Barry Melrose
Morris Mott
Jerome Mrazek
Barry Nieckar
Rod Norrish
John Rogers
Peter Schaefer
Gord Sherven
Sandy Snow
Dennis Sobchuk
Gene Sobchuk
Vic Venasky
Darcy Verot

See also
 List of ice hockey teams in Saskatchewan

External links
 

Saskatchewan Junior Hockey League teams
Former Western Hockey League teams
Weyburn
Ice hockey teams in Saskatchewan